Olof Rudolf Cederström (8 February 1764 – 1 June 1833) was a Swedish naval commander. Cederström enlisted in the Swedish admiralty in 1779 and as captain, he conducted a raid against Rogervik. He distinguished himself in 1790 at the naval Battle of Reval and the Battle of Viborg Bay. During the following years he led ships against privateers in the North Sea. He was sent in 1801 to fight alongside the United States Navy in the Mediterranean during the First Barbary War. In 1808 his ships were sent to blockade Gotland in order to repel a Russian invasion . His last military action was against Denmark and France in 1813, when he helped Swedish forces capture Vorpommern. In 1815, he was appointed a minister but returned to the navy in 1818. He finally resigned in 1828.

Career
Cederström was born on 8 February 1764in Landskrona, Sweden, the son of Claes Cederström and his wife Margareta Elisabet von Mevius. He was a student in Uppsala in 1776 and was admitted to war service at the Admiralty in 1779.

Career
Cederström became a petty officer (arklimästare) at the Admiralty on 3 August 1779 and was promoted to second lieutenant on 5 June 1781. In 1784 he became harbourmaster in Saint Barthélemy and on 15 August 1785 he was promoted to sub-lieutenant. Cederström was promoted to lieutenant on 21 July 1788. He distinguished himself during the Russo-Swedish War 1788–90 when he conducted a successful expedition to Rogervik (17 March 1790) as the commander of a small squadron of two frigates and a few brigs, where timber to a Russian archipelago fleet and much other military equipment was destroyed. For this he was appointed major on 26 March 1790. Cederström also distinguished himself during the Battle of Reval (13 May 1790) and the Battle of Vyborg Bay (4 July 1790).

He became lieutenant colonel at the Admiralty on 25 February 1793. Cederström became a member of the Committee of the Navy's Equipment on 22 April 1794 and colonel at the Admiralty on 21 June 1795. In 1796 and in 1798 he was cruising with a frigate squadron in the North Sea to protect the Nordic trade against the privateers. He was appointed commanding officer of the High Seas Navy (Örlogsflottan) on 6 April 1801 and was three days later promoted to rear admiral. Cederström was sent with a squadron to the Mediterranean to punish Tripolitanian pirates during the First Barbary War. After 20 months he made peace with Tripoli. In 1808 he took command of a squadron, which had the task of protecting the Swedish coast against a feared French-Danish landing. Also in 1808, Russia occupied the island of Gotland and a Swedish relief expedition under the command of Cederström was dispatched from Karlskrona to expel the Russian forces from the island, which was executed within three days. The Russian occupation accelerated, however, the establishment of the Gotland National Conscription and Cederström was commissioned as vice governor of the island to implement this arming of the people and to set the island in a state of defense.

Cederström was promoted to vice admiral on 29 June 1809 and he was military commander of Gotland from 13 August 1810 to 24 September 1811. In 1813 he was appointed general commander of the entire Swedish naval force against Denmark and the French allies, and in 1814, for a short time, over the naval force against Norway. Cederström was general commander of Guadeloupe in 1814 and was on duty as adjutant of the fleets on 5 August 1815. Cederström became minister (statsråd) on 8 August 1815 and the Governor of Stockholm and acting chancellor of the Royal War Academy on 30 July 1816. He was promoted to admiral on 24 November 1818 and resigned as the Governor of Stockholm on 15 December 1818. He received the title Count on 11 May 1819 and was promoted to överamiral on 1 June 1820 and was appointed Lord of the Realm on 5 November 1821. Cederström was promoted to general admiral and was appointed commanding officer of the Naval Artillery Regiment (Sjöartilleriregementet) on 7 October 1823. He was also appointed commanding officer of the Royal Majesty's Fleet, which according to Cederström's proposals was formed by merging the High Seas Navy (Örlogsflottan) and the Fleet of the Army. On this post, he was the victim of many attacks from parliament and the press side for dubious economic trades of warships from the navy, which led to his resignation in 1828 "at the end of his brilliant career". He then became an honorary member of the Uppsala County Agricultural Society on 28 January 1829.

Personal life
On 16 February 1793 he was married in Karlskrona to countess Charlotta Catharina Wrangel af Sauss (7 October 1767 in Karlskrona - 4 February 1848 in Lövsta), the daughter of the Lord of the Realm, First Admiral, Count Anton Johan Wrangel af Sauss and Countess Charlotta Regina Sparre af Söfdeborg.  During his last years, he lived on the estate Lövsta in Uppland County. Cederström died on 1 June 1833 at Lövsta in Funbo Parish, Uppsala County.

He was the father of:
Claes Anton (born 1795). Became count when his father died. 
Margareta-Charlotta (25 November 1796 in Karlskrona - 21 June 1883 in Karlskrona). She married on 25 November 1814 to Rear Admiral, Count Claes August Cronstedt (1785-1860).
Gustaf Adolf (born 1797)
Olof Rudolf (born 1800)
Carl-Emanuel (born 1804)
Fredrik Ture (born 1808)

Dates of rank
3 August 1779 – Arklimästare
5 June 1781 – Acting sub-lieutenant
15 August 1785 – Sub-lieutenant
21 July 1788 – Lieutenant
26 March 1790 – Major
22 December 1793 – Lieutenant colonel
21 June 1795 – Colonel
9 April 1801 – Rear admiral
1803 – Varvsamiral
29 June 1809 – Vice admiral
24 November 1818 – Admiral
1 June 1820 – Överamiral
7 October 1823 – General admiral

Awards, decorations and honours

Awards and decorations
   Order of Charles XIII (28 January 1825)
   Knight and Commander of the Orders of His Majesty the King (7 October 1816)
   Knight Grand Cross 2nd Class of the Order of the Sword (9 August 1814)
   Commander Grand Cross of the Order of the Sword (13 June 1803)
   Commander of the Order of the Sword (16 November 1799)
   Knight of the Order of the Sword (26 March 1790)

Honours
Honorary member of the Royal Swedish Academy of War Sciences (9 December 1809)
Honorary member of the Uppsala County Agricultural Society (28 January 1829)

Citations

References

External links
Article at Svenskt biografiskt lexikon

1764 births
1833 deaths
Swedish Navy admirals
People of the Barbary Wars
People involved in anti-piracy efforts
18th-century Swedish military personnel
19th-century Swedish military personnel
Swedish military commanders of the Napoleonic Wars
People of the Russo-Swedish War (1788–1790)
People from Landskrona Municipality
Commanders Grand Cross of the Order of the Sword
Knights of the Order of Charles XIII
Members of the Royal Swedish Academy of War Sciences